The 1975–76 NBA season was the 76ers 27th season in the NBA and 13th season in Philadelphia. The Philadelphia 76ers posted a 46–36 regular-season record, and returned to the NBA Playoffs for the first time since 1971, ending a string of four consecutive losing seasons. The team had acquired forward George McGinnis from the ABA's Indiana Pacers, and also drafted shooting guard Lloyd Free (later changed name to World B. Free). The Sixers, however, lost to the Buffalo Braves, two games to one in the first round of the Eastern Conference playoffs. This season would also be the last as a player for Billy Cunningham, who suffered an injury early in the season.

NBA Draft

Roster

Regular season

Season standings

z – clinched division title
y – clinched division title
x – clinched playoff spot

Record vs. opponents

Playoffs

|- align="center" bgcolor="#ffcccc"
| 1
| April 15
| Buffalo
| L 89–95
| Fred Carter (30)
| George McGinnis (15)
| George McGinnis (4)
| Spectrum14,352
| 0–1
|- align="center" bgcolor="#ccffcc"
| 2
| April 16
| @ Buffalo
| W 131–106
| George McGinnis (34)
| George McGinnis (11)
| Fred Carter (6)
| Buffalo Memorial Auditorium12,049
| 1–1
|- align="center" bgcolor="#ffcccc"
| 3
| April 18
| Buffalo
| L 123–124 (OT)
| Fred Carter (32)
| George McGinnis (15)
| Fred Carter (6)
| Spectrum13,087
| 1–2
|-

Awards and records
George McGinnis, All-NBA First Team, NBA All-Star
 Doug Collins, NBA All-Star

References

Philadelphia 76ers seasons
Philadelphia
Philadel
Philadel